The 2013 SBS Drama Awards is a ceremony honoring the best performances in television on the SBS network for the year 2013. It was held at the SBS Prism Tower in Sangam-dong, Seoul on December 31, 2013, and hosted by Lee Hwi-jae, Lee Bo-young, and Kim Woo-bin.

Nominations and winners
Complete list of nominees and winners:

(Winners denoted in bold)

Top 10 Stars
Jo In-sung - That Winter, the Wind Blows
Kim Woo-bin - The Heirs
Lee Bo-young - I Can Hear Your Voice
Lee Jong-suk - I Can Hear Your Voice
Lee Min-ho - The Heirs
Lee Yo-won - Empire of Gold
Nam Sang-mi - Goddess of Marriage
Park Shin-hye - The Heirs
So Ji-sub - Master's Sun
Song Hye-kyo - That Winter, the Wind Blows

New Star Award
Choi Jin-hyuk - The Heirs
Im Joo-hwan - Ugly Alert
Jung Eun-ji - That Winter, the Wind Blows
Kang Min-hyuk - The Heirs
Kang So-ra - Ugly Alert
Kim Ji-won - The Heirs
Kim So-hyun - The Suspicious Housekeeper
Kim Yoo-ri - Cheongdam-dong Alice, Master's Sun
Lee Da-hee - I Can Hear Your Voice
Seo In-guk - Master's Sun

References

External links
 

SBS
SBS Drama Awards
SBS
December 2013 events in South Korea